Fort Bliss is a 2014 American drama film directed and written by Claudia Myers, a military-based drama set on Fort Bliss. The film stars Michelle Monaghan, Ron Livingston, Pablo Schreiber, Emmanuelle Chriqui and Dash Mihok.

Premise
After returning home from an extended tour in Afghanistan, a decorated U.S. Army medic and single mother struggles to rebuild her relationship with her young son.

Cast 
 Michelle Monaghan as Maggie Swann
 Ron Livingston as Richard
 Pablo Schreiber as Staff Sergeant Donovan
 Emmanuelle Chriqui as Alma
 Dash Mihok as Staff Sergeant Malcolm
 Freddy Rodriguez as Cpt. Garver
 Gbenga Akinnagbe as Sgt. Butcher
 John Savage as Mike Swann
 Manolo Cardona as Luis
 Juan Gabriel Pareja as Javier
 Drew Garrett as SPC Cook
 Jacob Browne as 1st Sgt. Jeff Killens
 Fahim Fazli as Afghan Driver
 Oakes Fegley as Paul Swann (son)

Production

Casting
In October 2011 Michelle Monaghan was added to the cast to play the lead character. On April 5, 2012 Ron Livingston signed on to star opposite Monaghan.

Filming 

The filming of the drama Fort Bliss began in September 2012 in Los Angeles, filming later moved to Fort Bliss in El Paso, Texas.

Premiere
Fort Bliss premiered on September 11, 2014 at the DGA Theater in Los Angeles, CA. The premiere was hosted by the organization Veterans in Film and Television.

Reception 
On Rotten Tomatoes, the film holds an approval rating of 75% based on 16 reviews, with an average rating of 6.6/10. On Metacritic, the film has a weighted average score of 68 out of 100 based on 13 critics, indicating "generally favorable reviews".

References

External links 
 
 

2014 films
Films shot in Los Angeles
Films shot in El Paso, Texas
Films shot in New Mexico
Films set in Afghanistan
2014 drama films
American drama films
Films about the United States Army
Films about mother–son relationships
Films about veterans
Film
2010s English-language films
2010s American films